State Route 17 (SR 17)  is a major north-to-south highway within the U.S. state of Alabama. Covering  346.562 miles (557.737 km), it travels the length of the state between US 90 in Mobile and SR 13 at the Tennessee state line, north of Zip City.

Between Mobile and Deer Park in Washington County, SR 17 is the unsigned partner route assigned to U.S. Route 45 (US 45), and from Hamilton to Florence, it serves as the signed partner route assigned to US 43. It is the longest state route in Alabama that is not entirely the unsigned partner of a U.S. Route.

Route description
The southern terminus of US 45 and SR 17 is at their intersection with US 98 and unsigned SR 42 in Mobile. US 45 and SR 17 assume a northwestward trajectory as they leave Mobile heading towards the Mississippi state line. Near the small community of Deer Park in southern Washington County, SR 17 diverts from US 45 and becomes a signed route.

After the split from US 45, SR 17 assumes a general northerly orientation as it passes through rural areas and small towns in western Alabama. The route passes through the Black Belt, historically one of the poorer areas of the state. After leaving Mobile, the route does not pass through any towns whose population exceeds 5,000 until it approaches Hamilton in Marion County. At Hamilton, SR 17 once again becomes an unsigned route upon the second junction it has with US 43; US 45 and SR 17 are the southern terminus of US 43 in Mobile.

Between Hamilton and Muscle Shoals, SR 17 is a signed route. At Muscle Shoals, US 43, SR 17 and SR 13 intersect US 72 and several other state routes. At this point, SR 17 once again becomes a signed route as it leads through Muscle Shoals and Florence as it heads towards its northern terminus at the Tennessee state line, where it becomes Tennessee State Route 13.

History

SR 17 was designated in 1940 between Kennedy and York. In 1952, the route was extended south to Mobile; from York to Deer Park, SR 29 was renumbered as part of SR 17, and from Deer Park to Mobile the route traveled concurrently with US 45. SR 17 was extended north to the Tennessee state line in 1956. To accomplish this, SR 17 replaced old SR 19 up to Hamilton, was concurrent with US 43 up to Florence, and replaced old SR 34 the rest of the way to the Tennessee state line.

Major intersections

See also

References

External links

017
017
U.S. Route 43
Transportation in Mobile County, Alabama
Transportation in Washington County, Alabama
Transportation in Choctaw County, Alabama
Transportation in Sumter County, Alabama
Transportation in Pickens County, Alabama
Transportation in Lamar County, Alabama
Transportation in Marion County, Alabama
Transportation in Franklin County, Alabama
Transportation in Colbert County, Alabama
Transportation in Lauderdale County, Alabama